PERMIAS is an organization that unites Indonesian college students in the United States. The organization was founded on 24 December 1961 in Washington, D.C. PERMIAS is an Indonesian acronym for Persatuan Mahasiswa Indonesia Seluruh Amerika Serikat. Translated into English, it means "Organization of the Indonesian Students in the United States". The group organizes many annual events and competitions for Indonesian students in the US.

About Permias
Sometimes Permias is also called ISA, which stands for Indonesian Student Association (equivalent to PPI - Persatuan Pelajar Indonesia - which is the organization that unites Indonesian college students in other countries such as in the United Kingdom). The difference usually is that ISA only accepting members from certain institutes / universities, whereas Permias is more loosely accepting members from schools within the region - and sometimes even non-students like alumni.

Every Permias chapter stands for itself and rarely has any ties with other Permias groups except for the Permias National Chapter. The Permias National Chapter is the head of all the regional Permias Chapter. The representatives of each Permias Chapter is encouraged to meet in the Permias National Congress which is scheduled to happen every 2–3 years. The first National Congress was the Congress of Indonesian Diaspora.

Unfortunately, due to the decreasing amount of Indonesian Student Population in the United States, Permias National have some inconsistency of holding the National Congress. The decline of the student population is mostly caused by the financial crisis in 1998/1999. However, the trend today shows a constant increase Indonesian Student Population. In 2011/2012 academic year, there are about 7,131 Indonesian Students in the United States. Although, it looks like an increasing number, it is still far from the peak number of Indonesian Students during the 1997/1998 academic year that is 13,828 students. The current growth of Indonesian student population is said to be about 2.7%/ year.

The first National Congress did after the long hiatus was on May 25, 2013, in Washington D.C. called the Permias Congress 2013. The following National Congress was held on May 23, 2015 in New York City.

Another big event held by Permias National is the Permias National Cup. The Permias National Cup is a sports event where each region (east, west, midwest) of Permias chapters competes against each other in Basketball and Soccer Tournaments. The winner from each region (1st and 2nd winner) get to compete in the Permias National Cup. The first Permias National Cup was held in Chicago in 2014. The teams that compete in the Basketball Tournament were Madison, Purdue, Chicago, Massachusetts, Los Angeles, Seattle and New York City. For the Futsal Tournament, there were Penn State, Purdue, Chicago & Milwaukee, Urbana-Champaign, Massachusetts, Los Angeles, DC, Seattle and New York City. The next Permias National Cup will be held in around February 2016 at Seattle.

There is no exact data on how many Permias / ISA are in U.S., as there is no annual meeting between local organizations' officers or the like. Some of them have their own student-maintained websites, some used to have one, and some don't have the manpower to create one.

The Committee
The Permias National is led by a Secretary General followed by a Deputy Secretary General. There are also several committees of the Permias National that includes Communication, Social, Cultural, Academic, Finance and Administration. Also,  there are representatives of each Permias Chapters, who served on the council. The council is led by the Secretary General and the Deputy Secretary General, whereas the Committees are a separate entity that is supervised by the Council. The information regarding the current board can be found in Permias National’s website.

Elections
The Permias National elections is held yearly. For more information, please visit Pemilu 2020-2021.

See also
Indonesian American
Indonesia

Footnotes

Chapters
Permias has over 80 chapters across the United States spread all around the West, Midwest, South, and East Coasts. Some of the chapters are linked below. For complete information of all current active chapters, please visit the Permias Nasional Chapters Page. 
PERMIAS Massachusetts - Based in Boston
PERMIAS San Francisco Bay Area
PERMIAS Seattle
PERMIAS San Diego
PERMIAS Minnesota-Twin Cities
PERMIAS Washington DC
 Permias Tucson - University of Arizona
 Permias Greater Lansing - Michigan State University
 Permias Louisiana State University, Baton Rouge website
 Permias Los Angeles website
 Permias Columbus - Ohio website
 Permias Virginia Tech
 Permias Massachusetts
 Permias Chicago
 Permias Oregon State University
 Permias Ames
 Permias Buffalo
 Permias Michigan Ann Arbor & Ypsilanti
 Permias Texas A&M University (TAMU)(College Station, Texas)
 PERMIAS Austin
 Indonesian Student Club in Urbana-Champaign
PERMIAS Wichita
Permias Penn State
PERMIAS Golden

Asian-American organizations
Indonesian American
Student societies in the United States